Isocrinida is an order of sea lilies which contains four extant families.

Characteristics
Members of this order are characterised by having a "heteromorphic" stalk; the stalk consists of a series of nodes with cirri, interspersed by several nodes without cirri. There are additionally a whorl of cirri at the base on which the animal perches. The calyx is a shallow cup consisting of five basals and five radials.

Families
 Suborder Isocrinina Sieverts-Doreck, 1952
 family Cainocrinidae Simms, 1988 -- 1 genus (1 species)
 family Isocrinidae Gislén, 1924 -- 3 genus (3 species)
 family Isselicrinidae Klikushkin, 1977 -- 4 genus (18 species)
 family Proisocrinidae Rasmussen, 1978 -- 1 genus (1 species)
 Suborder Pentacrinitina Gray, 1842 †
 family Pentacrinitidae Gray, 1842 †

References

Hess H (2011) Isocrinida. In: Hess, H., Messing, C.G., Ausich, W.I. (Eds.), Treatise on Invertebrate Paleontology, Part T, Echinodermata 2 Revised, Crinoidea, vol. 3. University of Kansas Press, Lawrence, Kansas, pp. 42–69.

 
Articulata (Crinoidea)
Anisian first appearances
Extant Middle Triassic first appearances
Echinoderm orders